American Crime is an American anthology crime drama television series created by John Ridley that aired on ABC from March 5, 2015, to April 30, 2017. The first season centers on race, class, and gender politics as it follows the lives of the participants in a trial who are forever changed during the legal process.

The series follows an anthology format with each season featuring a self-contained story with new characters, often played by the same group of actors. Actors featured prominently in all three seasons include Felicity Huffman, Timothy Hutton, Richard Cabral, Benito Martinez, Lili Taylor, and Regina King; while Elvis Nolasco and Connor Jessup have starring roles in two seasons.

The series was renewed for a second season in May 2015. The second season, which premiered on-demand on December 17, 2015, and premiered on ABC on January 6, 2016, In May 2016, ABC renewed the series for a third season, which premiered on March 12, 2017. On May 11, 2017, ABC cancelled the series after three seasons.

All three seasons of American Crime received critical acclaim. In 2015, the series received ten Primetime Emmy Award nominations, including for Outstanding Limited Series, Writing for a Miniseries, Movie or a Dramatic Special (Ridley), Lead Actress in a Miniseries or Movie (Huffman), Lead Actor in a Miniseries or Movie (Hutton), Supporting Actor in a Miniseries or Movie (Cabral), and a win for Supporting Actress in a Miniseries or Movie (King). In 2016, it received four Primetime Emmy Award nominations, including another for Outstanding Limited Series, with Huffman and Taylor being both nominated for Lead Actress in a Miniseries or Movie and King receiving a second win for Supporting Actress in a Miniseries or Movie.

Overview 
The first season takes place in Modesto, California, where a war veteran becomes the victim of a home invasion gone wrong and the lives of four people are forever changed after each one is connected to the crime.

The second season takes place in Indianapolis, Indiana, where the co-captains of a private school's basketball team are accused of sexually assaulting a male classmate and posting photographs of the incident online.

The third season takes place in Alamance County, North Carolina, where five people struggle to survive in a place where the American Dream comes with a price.

Cast and characters

Season 1

Main
 Felicity Huffman as Barbara "Barb" Hanlon
 Timothy Hutton as Russ Skokie
 W. Earl Brown as Thomas "Tom" Carlin
 Richard Cabral as Hector Tontz
 Caitlin Gerard as Aubry Taylor
 Benito Martinez as Alonzo Gutiérrez
 Penelope Ann Miller as Eve Carlin
 Elvis Nolasco as Carter Nix
 Johnny Ortiz as Anthony "Tony" Gutiérrez

Recurring

Season 2

Main
 Felicity Huffman as Leslie Graham, the private school's manipulative principal
 Timothy Hutton as Dan Sullivan, the school's basketball coach
 Lili Taylor as Anne Blaine, Taylor's mother
 Elvis Nolasco as Chris Dixon, a public school's principal
 Trevor Jackson as Kevin LaCroix, a private school student and captain of the basketball team
 Connor Jessup as Taylor Blaine, the sexual assault accuser
 Joey Pollari as Eric Tanner, the closeted gay basketball player accused of sexual assault by Taylor
 Angelique Rivera as Evy Dominguez, Taylor's girlfriend
 Regina King as Terri LaCroix, Kevin's strict mother

Recurring

Season 3

Main
 Felicity Huffman as Jeanette Hesby
 Timothy Hutton as Nicholas Coates
 Lili Taylor as Clair Coates, Nicholas' wife
 Connor Jessup as Coy Henson, a young American who is addicted to drugs
 Richard Cabral as Isaac Castillo, a farm crew chief
 Benito Martinez as Luis Salazar, a father from Mexico who wants to find his missing son
 Regina King as Kimara Walters, a social worker who wants to have a baby

Recurring
 Sandra Oh as Abby Tanaka
 Cherry Jones as Laurie Ann Hesby, the matriarch of Hesby Farms
 Tim DeKay as JD Hesby, Laurie Ann's brother.
 Janel Moloney as Raelyn, Jeanette's sister, a single mother recently abandoned by her husband.
 Dallas Roberts as Carson Hesby, Jeanette's husband
 Ana Mulvoy-Ten as Shae Reese, a 17-year-old sex worker
 Mickaëlle X. Bizet as Gabrielle Durand, a Haitian woman, the nanny of the Coates' son
 Clayton Cardenas as Diego Castillo, Isaac's brother

Cast table
The following cast table only includes actors who appear in multiple seasons.

Production

Development and casting
In October 2013, ABC announced it was developing a drama pilot created by John Ridley. In January 2014, ABC greenlighted the pilot, and signed a deal with Ridley to direct.

Elvis Nolasco and Caitlin Gerard were the first regular members to be cast, as announced on February 14, 2014. Later Richard Cabral, Johnny Ortiz, Benito Martinez and W. Earl Brown were cast for regular supporting roles in the pilot. In early March, Timothy Hutton was cast in a lead role as Russ, and Penelope Ann Miller signed on in a supporting role of the mother of the murdered man's wife. Soon thereafter, it was announced that Felicity Huffman was cast in the lead role of Barb Skokie, Russ' stoic ex-wife and mother of the murdered young man.

Filming
The pilot episode, along with further episodes, was filmed in Austin, Texas, which substitutes for the California city of Modesto. On May 8, 2014, ABC picked up the pilot to the series for the 2014–15 television season.

Filming for the series moved to Los Angeles, California with the third season, as the show's production was awarded a California tax credit.

Episodes

Reception

Critical response

All three seasons of American Crime received widespread critical acclaim, with praise going towards the writing, directing, and the performances of its cast (particularly Felicity Huffman and Regina King). On the review aggregation website Rotten Tomatoes, the overall series holds a 96% rating. On Metacritic, which uses a weighted average, the overall series received a score of 86 out of 100.

Season 1
On Rotten Tomatoes, the first season received a rating of 94% based on 47 reviews with an average rating of 8.3 out of 10. The site's critical consensus reads, "Raw, emotional portrayals of diverse characters in dire pain, mashed up with chilling narratives and a gutsy attitude make American Crime a must-see." On Metacritic, it garnered a score of 85 out of 100, based on 35 reviews, indicating "universal acclaim." Deadline Hollywood critic Dominic Patten said in his review: "the 11-episode limited series marks a resounding flag planting by network television and tells cable that it doesn't own poignant drama on our small screens." Critic Ed Bark praised the performance of Felicity Huffman and wrote that she would be a favorite to win at next year's Primetime Emmy Awards.

Season 2
On Rotten Tomatoes, the second season has a 95% rating based on 38 reviews with an average score of 8.1 out of 10. The site's critical consensus reads, "American Crimes intense second season infuses a complicated, topical story with genuine emotion, and patiently allows its narrative arc to develop without sacrificing momentum." On Metacritic, it has a score of 85 out of 100 based on 26 reviews, indicating "universal acclaim."

Season 3
The third season received more acclaim than the first two seasons. On Rotten Tomatoes, it has a 100% rating, based on 31 reviews with an average score of 9 out of 10. The site's critical consensus reads, "American Crime offers a unique anthology series filled with surprising revelations and compelling inter-connected narratives that opt for original, emotional human commentary instead of tired arguments over current events." On Metacritic, it has a score of 90 out of 100, based on 26 reviews, indicating "universal acclaim". Verne Gay of Newsday called it "Another brilliant, powerful, moving season of one of TV's best."

Ratings

Accolades

References

External links
 

2010s American crime drama television series
2010s American LGBT-related drama television series
2015 American television series debuts
2017 American television series endings
American Broadcasting Company original programming
2010s American anthology television series
English-language television shows
Primetime Emmy Award-winning television series
Rape in television
Television series by ABC Studios
Television shows directed by Steph Green
Television shows filmed in Texas
Television shows set in Modesto, California
Television shows set in Indianapolis
Racism in television
Works about rape
Homophobia in fiction
Television series about dysfunctional families
Television series created by John Ridley